Charlie Smith is an American jazz and pop saxophonist, pianist, and record producer.

Early career 
Smith began his career as a saxophonist and pianist at Cornish College of the Arts in Seattle.

Inspired by his mentor, Jim Knapp, and early collaborator Julian Priester, he formed a jazz big band, Charlie Smith Circle. The band released its debut album, Ahead and Behind, in 2004.

Pop music 
In 2006 Smith began working with musicians outside the jazz community. He wrote horn arrangements for Josh Ottum's Like The Season and Aqueduct's, Or Give Me Death.
In 2008 he joined the Seattle indie-pop band Throw Me the Statue, playing bass, keyboards, saxophone, and writing horn arrangements. Smith appeared as a player and producer on the band's EP, Purpleface and second album, Creaturesque. Smith  produced the second album by Seattle hip hop MC, Katie Kate, Nation. Also released in 2014 was the Charlie Smith produced Kairos EP on Fin Records in Seattle.
Working closely with Polyvinyl Records artist Pillar Point, Smith helped develop the band's sound.

In Summer 2014 Smith was named Seattle's best producer by the alternative paper Seattle Weekly in their annual Best of Seattle issue.

Discography

As leader
 Charlie Smith Circle, Ahead and Behind (2004) – composer, arranger

As producer
 Victor Noriega, "Stone's Throw", (2006)
 Aqueduct, Or Give Me Death, (2007)
 Throw Me the Statue, "Purpleface" (2008) 
 Throw Me the Statue, "Creaturesque", (2009)
 Annabel Lee, "Lone Bodies" (2012)
 Truckasuarus, "2012" (2012)
 Pollens "Brighten & Break" (2012)
 Kairos, "EP" (2014)

References

External links 
 
 Studio Nels
 All Music Credits
 Throw Me the Statue

1979 births
Living people
American jazz composers
American jazz musicians
Musicians from Seattle
American male jazz composers